Karlsplatz  is a station on ,  and  of the Vienna U-Bahn. It is located in the Innere Stadt District. It first opened on June 30, 1899, as the Academiestrasse station of the Wiener Stadtbahn, and received its current name in the same year that the associated square was named after Karl VI. At the same time, the company abbreviation changed from AK to KP. After the cessation of steam operation in 1918, the Wiener Elektrische Stadtbahn operated as a replacement from 1925. Upon the commissioning of the first subway section of the U1 from Reumannplatz on February 25, 1978, Karlsplatz also became an underground station and, after the platforms on Lines U2 and U4 opened in 1980, is now the largest transport hub for Wiener Linien.

Art

The following art is found in the station. 
 "Pi" by Ken Lum. 
 Rauminstallation by Peter Kogler
 Fries "Unisono di colori" by Ernst Friedrich and Eleonor Friedrich

References

Buildings and structures in Innere Stadt
Railway stations opened in 1978
Vienna U-Bahn stations
1978 establishments in Austria
Railway stations in Austria opened in the 20th century